The Slovak Women's Cup is the annual cup competition of women's football teams in Slovakia. It was established in 2009.

List of finals
The list of finals so far:

A  No extra time played.

See also
Slovak Cup, men's cup

References

External links
Official website

Slo
Women's football competitions in Slovakia
Recurring sporting events established in 2009
2009 establishments in Slovakia
women